Chlorolestes is a genus of damselflies in the family Synlestidae. They are commonly known as Malachites.

The genus is endemic to southern Africa; furthermore, the range of only one species, Chlorolestes elegans, extends further north than north-eastern South Africa.

The genus contains the following species:
Chlorolestes apricans  - Basking Malachite
Chlorolestes conspicuus  - Conspicuous Malachite
Chlorolestes draconicus  - Drakensberg Malachite
Chlorolestes elegans  - Elegant Malachite
Chlorolestes fasciatus  - Mountain Malachite
Chlorolestes tessellatus  - Forest Malachite
Chlorolestes umbratus  - White Malachite

References

Synlestidae
Zygoptera genera
Taxa named by Edmond de Sélys Longchamps
Taxonomy articles created by Polbot